No Dream (stylized as N OD R E A M) is the fourth solo album by American singer-songwriter Jeff Rosenstock. It was released on May 20, 2020, without any promotional lead-up. The album was released on Polyvinyl Record Co. in the United States and by Specialist Subject Records in the United Kingdom. It is also available directly from the artist through Quote Unquote Records and Really Records.

Ten percent of proceeds from any digital sales made from the album are being donated to the Food Not Bombs mutual aid network.

On April 20, 2021 Rosenstock released Ska Dream (stylized as S K AD R E A M), a fully rerecorded rendition of the album as a ska album.

Critical reception

No Dream was met with universal acclaim reviews from critics. At Metacritic, which assigns a weighted average rating out of 100 to reviews from mainstream publications, this release received an average score of 85, based on 7 reviews.

In the review for Exclaim!, Adam Feibel wrote that the album was "probably the most Jeff Rosenstock of all Jeff Rosenstock records thus far. It's fun, loud and boisterous. It's packed to the brim but sounds so simple. It's sneakily cheeky and curiously charming." Writing for Pitchfork, Ian Cohen claimed that the album was "quintessential Jeff Rosenstock—an album formulated around evergreen sociopolitical concerns yet sounds like it could’ve been written 30 minutes ago." Talking the album in a review for Under the Radar, Caleb Campbell stated that "[Rosenstock] is just as self-effacing, funny, and principled as ever. He is still creating quality additions to one of the most consistent punk discographies out there. Most importantly, his music is still an absolute blast to experience, looking towards an uncertain future with a beautiful collective spirit."

Kyle Kohner was slightly more reserved when appraising the album for Beats Per Minute, claiming that "NO DREAM can be rather skin-deep when it comes to commentary on society-at-large, it’s a little more complex and tender when the record veers to Rosenstock himself as the subject. Through every desire to watch it all crash and burn into rubble, Rosenstock also throws in instances that are disarmingly human." Reviewing the album for AllMusic, Mark Deming called it a "passionate and kicks out the jams, not suggesting he wants to reinvent the wheel but that he knows how to get it to roll and pushes it fast and hard in the right direction."

Accolades

Track listing

Personnel 
Death Rosenstock
 Dan Potthast – acoustic guitar, keyboards, vocals
 Jeff Rosenstock – lead vocals, guitars, keyboards, mixing, "n more"
 John DeDomenici – bass
 Mike Huguenor – guitars, vocals
 Kevin Higuchi – drums

Additional personnel
 Chris Farren – keyboards, vocals (tracks 8 and 12)
 Laura Stevenson – vocals (tracks 3, 6, 7, 8 and 12)
 Lauren Brief – vocals (track 4), backing vocals, claps
 Bob Vielma – trombone (tracks 6, 10 and 13)
 Gilbert Armendariz – backing vocals, claps
 Angelina Banda – backing vocals, claps
 Sim Castro – backing vocals, claps
 Laura Hammond – backing vocals, claps
 Neil Sharma – backing vocals, claps
 Jack Shirley – recording, engineering, production, mixing, mastering
 Ben Levin – illustrations
 Hiro Tanaka – photography

Ska Dream 
Ska Dream was announced through Twitter on April Fools' Day, 2021, and was released on April 20. Due to the lack of other promotion, many assumed the announcement was a joke.

Although the song titles are all altered to contain puns and references to ska culture, the lyrics are identical to the original album (with the exception of a rapped guest verse by Boboso on the third track and a few additional lines sung by Anika Pyle on the final track). Two tracks' new arrangements contain brief quotes from songs by other artists: the first track quotes "Our Time" by The Suicide Machines, the seventh quotes "Nite Klub" by The Specials.

Track listing

Personnel 
Death Rosenstock
 John DeDomenici – bass
 Kevin Higuchi – drums, percussion
 Mike Huguenor – guitar
 Jer Hunter – trombone, trumpet
 Rick Johnson – Hammond, Farfisa, Casio CZ101
 Christine Mackie – bells
 Dan Potthast – acoustic guitar, piano, vocals
 Jeff Rosenstock – vocals, guitar, tenor saxophone, baritone saxophone, Farfisa, Juno 106, Moog Prodigy, lyra, Wurlitzer, bells, Space Echo, artwork design
 Laura Stevenson – vocals

Additional Personnel
 Ara Babajian – additional cymbals (track 6)
 Sean Bonnette – vocals (track 13)
 Boboso – rapping (credited with "sick bars") (track 3)
 George Clarke – vocals (track 4)
 David Combs – vocals (track 3)
 Chris Farren – guitar, vocals (track 7)
 Augusta Koch – vocals (tracks 2 and 4)
 Angelo Moore – saxophone solo (track 6)
 Franz Nicolay – piano (credited with "luxurious piano") (track 6)
 nonregla – dub effects, production (credited with "additional cool dub shit") (track 5)
 Elise Okusami – vocals (tracks 3 and 7)
 Mike Park – tenor saxophone (track 8)
 PUP – vocals (tracks 10 and 13)
 Anika Pyle – vocals (tracks 2 and 13)
 Shannon Toombes – vocals (tracks 2, 7, and 9)
 Matt Embree – drum recording
 Ryan Perras – guitar recording for Mike Huguenor
 Jack Shirley – mixing, mastering
 Ben Levin – illustrations

References 

2020 albums
Jeff Rosenstock albums
Polyvinyl Record Co. albums